Sören Dalevi (born 12 June 1969 in Björneborg), is a Swedish prelate and theologian. Since 2012 he has been a lecturer in religious studies at Karlstad University. In 2016 he was elected as Bishop of Karlstad.

Biography
Sören Dalevi was ordained as a priest in 1996, after which he became vicar in the parish of Grums. He was the founder of youth work in the Diocese of Karlstad between 1997-2000 and committees in the parish of Norrstrands in Karlstad between 2000-2003. He then pursued research studies at Karlstad University. Between 2008-2012 Dalevi was a member of the school board at Geijerskolan. Dalevi's research focused on church education.

On Thursday 28 April 2016 he was elected Bishop of Karlstad. At the preliminary voting session, Sören Dalevi received 59.1% of the votes. The other candidate who took part in the election. Karin Johannesson, gained 40.9% of the votes.

References

Living people
1969 births
Swedish Lutheran bishops
21st-century Lutheran bishops
Academic staff of Karlstad University
Bishops of Karlstad